Senna multijuga, the November shower or false sicklepod, is a species of flowering plant in the family Fabaceae. It is native to wet tropical areas of Latin America, and widely introduced to other tropical locales such as Africa, India, Indonesia, China, Australia, and Hawaii.

Subtaxa
The following subtaxa are accepted:
Senna multijuga subsp. doylei  – southwestern Mexico
Senna multijuga subsp. lindleyana  – Colombia, Venezuela, Brazil
Senna multijuga subsp. multijuga – entire range, introduced to Old World Tropics
Senna multijuga var. peregrinatrix  – Colombia, Venezuela, Brazil
Senna multijuga var. verrucosa  – eastern Brazil

References

multijuga
Ornamental trees
Flora of Mexico
Flora of Honduras
Flora of Panama
Flora of western South America
Flora of northern South America
Flora of Brazil
Plants described in 1982